Maritalea myrionectae is a Gram-negative, rod-shaped, strictly aerobic bacterium from the genus of Maritalea which was isolated from the protist Mesodinium rubrum in Kunsan in the Republic of Korea.

References

External links
Type strain of Maritalea myrionectae at BacDive -  the Bacterial Diversity Metadatabase

Hyphomicrobiales
Bacteria described in 2009